The orange bullfinch (Pyrrhula aurantiaca) is a species of finch in the family Fringillidae.
It is found in India and Pakistan. Its natural habitat is temperate forests.

Taxonomy
The taxonomy was described in 2001 by Arnaiz-Villena et al. All birds belonging to the genus Pyrrhula have a common ancestor: Pinicola enucleator.

References

orange bullfinch
Birds of Pakistan
Birds of North India
orange bullfinch
Taxonomy articles created by Polbot